The 2012 UK & Ireland Greyhound Racing Year was the 87th year of greyhound racing in the United Kingdom and Ireland.

Summary
During May, the GRA announced a bank debt of £49 million under their parent company Risk Capital Partners, Risk had borrowed the money from the IBRC (Irish Bank Resolution Corporation) to buy GRA. The on-going profits of all five tracks only serviced the interest on the debt and it then emerged that a partner in the original GRA takeover with Risk was a company called Galliard Homes. This came to light after plans were drawn up by them to build houses on Wimbledon and Oxford Stadium to reduce the debt. The entire scenario was effectively a disaster for the greyhound industry with the leading greyhound track operator showing intent to end their role in the sport. 

Oxford Stadium closed on 29 December, a move regarded as an attempt by the GRA to force the local council into passing future planning submissions.

Paschal Taggart owner of Shelbourne Park revealed plans to buy Wimbledon and redevelop it into a super stadium at a cost of £30 million. This was followed by an announcement from GRA Managing Director Clive Feltham supporting rival plans to end greyhound racing there and let AFC Wimbledon rebuild a football stadium with associated housing.

Tracks
Norah McEllistrim left Wimbledon for Hove, the McEllistrim ties with Wimbledon dated back to 1929. Brighton had been seeking a replacement for three-time winner of the Trainers Championship Brian Clemenson who had announced his retirement. In addition to McEllistrim, the track would also recruit Dean Childs and Paul Garland. John Mullins returned to Yarmouth and Paul Sallis moved from Hall Green to Monmore.

The GRA released the Grand National out of their control allowing Sittingbourne to host it. A bid by the well-known professional gambler and owner Harry Findlay to re-open Coventry finally went ahead after being licensed by the Greyhound Board of Great Britain. Kevin Boothby took over sole control of Henlow Stadium following Bob Morton's departure.

Clonmel and Tralee earned contributions from the Irish Greyhound Board. Mystery surrounded the closure of independent track Westhoughton Greyhound Track near Bolton, just months before it was due to reopen following a £100,000 facelift. The stadium had undergone £30,000 improvements the previous year and a 20-year lease had been secured by a new owner, but work came to a halt and the site closed.

Competitions
The blue riband events, the 2012 English Greyhound Derby and 2012 Irish Greyhound Derby were won by Blonde Snapper and Skywalker Puma respectively; both went on to win the accolade greyhound of the year. Nick Savva claimed a surprise Trainers Championship success at Perry Barr; it was the fourth time he had secured the championship.

The youngster Farloe Warhawk impressed during the Laurels winning the event unbeaten before being rested for the winter. The black dog also won the Puppy Derby in August pipping kennelmate Ballymac Eske.

News
The new Racing Post TV channel (RPGTV) started in February when it featured the heats of the Golden Jacket at Crayford Stadium. The channel had been set up in the partnership of Hills, Ladbrokes, Coral, bet365 and Betfair.

Champion sprinter Jimmy Lollie was retired to stud in June after finishing lame at Hove. Mark Wallis sealed a fourth trainers title.

Roll of honour

Principal UK finals

Principal Irish finals

References 

Greyhound racing in the United Kingdom
Greyhound racing in the Republic of Ireland
2012 in British sport
2012 in Irish sport